Diane Medved Harper is a professor in the Department of Family Medicine at the University of Michigan. Her area of expertise is human papillomavirus (HPV) and the diseases associated with it, as well as colposcopy, and she was one of the investigators in the clinical trials of Gardasil and Cervarix, vaccines against HPV.

Early life and education
Harper grew up in Kansas City; her father was an electrical and mechanical engineer. Her mother died in 1981, of breast cancer, while Harper was at graduate school.

A graduate of the University of Kansas (where she completed a residency in family medicine), Harper also completed undergraduate and graduate degrees at the Massachusetts Institute of Technology in chemical engineering,  before attending Stanford University and Harvard University to receive her public health degree. Her decision to go to medical school instead of continuing to study engineering was made in 1981, when, on Thanksgiving Day, she called her dad and told him that her heart wasn't in engineering. While at Stanford, she studied medical decision making and cost-effectiveness analysis. Harper's degrees include MD, MPH, and MS.

Research and career
From 2013 to 2017 she was a professor and chair of the department of Family and Geriatric Medicine at the University of Louisville. From 2009 to 2013 she was a professor at the University of Missouri Kansas City's department of Biomedical and Health Informatics. From 1996 to 2009 she held a clinical, teaching, and research post at Dartmouth Medical School.

Harper has been appointed to the Institute for Healthcare Policy and Innovation at the University of Michigan, Ann Arbor, MI and the Physician director for Community Outreach, Engagement and Health Disparities at the University of Michigan Rogel Cancer Center.

In 2016, Harper was appointed to the United States Preventive Services Task Force.

Views on HPV vaccines
Harper has stated that Gardasil "is a good vaccine and ... is generally safe", and told the Guardian "I fully support the HPV vaccines ... I believe that in general they are safe in most women." However, since 2009 Harper has questioned the cost-benefit analysis of Gardasil in countries where pap smears are regularly available, and has stated that the vaccine has been overpromoted. In a 2011 NPR interview, she argued against mandatory HPV vaccines for schoolchildren, saying "Ninety-five percent of women who are infected with HPV never, ever get cervical cancer." In a July 2013 interview, she stated that she advocates personal choice and an individualized approach to HPV vaccination, saying that she provides "a balanced picture to my patients and their families and am not at all upset if they refuse the vaccine, especially at younger ages." Harper appeared on a December 2013 episode of Katie Couric's show Katie devoted to the HPV vaccine, and stated that newly developed pap screenings that combine HPV testing and cytology have a nearly 100% ability to detect pre-cancers and cancers; she also said that Gardasil doesn't last long enough to prevent cervical cancer and that there are some harms associated with it.

Harper appeared at the International Public Conference on Vaccination, a conference held by the National Vaccine Information Center, a U.S. anti-vaccine group, apparently not realizing that it was an anti-vaccination event. She also appeared in The Greater Good, an anti-vaccine film.

Awards and honors
In 2006, while Harper was on the faculty and staff of Dartmouth Medical School, the New Hampshire Academy of Family Physicians named her the New Hampshire Family Physician of the Year.

In May 2013, Harper received the Prix Monte-Carlo Woman of the Year award in Monte Carlo for her contributions and discoveries defining the role of HPV in the pathology of cervical cancer.

In May 2013, Harper also received the Society of Teachers of Family Medicine Excellence in Education Award for her "excellence in education at every level from medical students, family medicine residents, residents in obstetrics and gynecology, national and international meetings, and to the public and national audiences via television, including an appearance on the Dr Oz show ...." The award also noted that Harper "helped establish the US national guidelines for the nomenclature of cytology and the screening and management of abnormal cytology and histology reports" and "consulted for the World Health Organization on the use of prophylactic HPV vaccines".

In October 2015, Harper was named the Alum of the Year by the Notre Dame de Sion School system.

Publications

References

External links
Diane Harper at UMKC

Living people
Vaccinologists
University of Louisville faculty
University of Kansas alumni
University of Missouri–Kansas City faculty
Women medical researchers
Year of birth missing (living people)
University of Michigan faculty